Marcus Thomas (born 10 June 1970 in Bridgetown, Barbados) is a super middleweight Barbadian boxer who turned pro in 2001. He represented Barbados in the 1992 Summer Olympics, 1996 Summer Olympics, 1991 Pan American Games, 1995 Pan American Games, the 1994 Commonwealth Games and the 1998 Central American and Caribbean Games, where he won a silver medal in the light middleweight category.

Professional boxing record

References

Barbadian male boxers
1970 births
Living people
Sportspeople from Bridgetown
Competitors at the 1998 Central American and Caribbean Games
Central American and Caribbean Games silver medalists for Barbados
Pan American Games competitors for Barbados
Boxers at the 1991 Pan American Games
Boxers at the 1995 Pan American Games
Commonwealth Games competitors for Barbados
Boxers at the 1994 Commonwealth Games
Olympic boxers of Barbados
Boxers at the 1992 Summer Olympics
Boxers at the 1996 Summer Olympics
Super-middleweight boxers
Central American and Caribbean Games medalists in boxing